The Taiwan Allies International Protection and Enhancement Initiative (TAIPEI) Act of 2019 (TAIPEI Act;) is an Act of the United States Congress. It aims to increase the scope of US relations with Taiwan and encourage other nations and international organizations to strengthen their official and unofficial ties with the island nation.

The law is considered a further upgrade to Taiwan–United States relations after passing the Taiwan Travel Act in 2018 and was passed at a time in which the People's Republic of China was engaged in a campaign to restrict the diplomatic space of Taiwan.

Background

After Tsai Ing-wen was inaugurated as President of Taiwan in 2016, the People's Republic of China (mainland China) started an extensive campaign to isolate the island state internationally, and by 2019 the number of countries maintaining official relations with Taipei had fallen from 22 to 15. Meanwhile, following the election of Donald Trump as U.S. president, U.S.–China relations had deteriorated, especially since the start of the China–United States trade war in 2018. While Taiwan felt its international space shrinking, relations with the US saw major breakthroughs, including a phone call between Trump and Tsai, the passage of the Taiwan Travel Act, and cabinet-level meetings between the two countries. In order to disincentivize remaining countries to switch recognition away from Taiwan, and to allow the island greater participation in international organizations, the TAIPEI Act was conceived.

Provisions
Provisions of the TAIPEI Act state that the U.S. should:
Advocate, as appropriate, for Taiwan's membership in all international organizations in which statehood is not a requirement and in which the United States is also a participant; and for Taiwan to be granted observer status in other appropriate international organizations;
To instruct, as appropriate, representatives of the United States Government in all organizations to use the voice, vote, and influence of the United States to advocate for Taiwan's membership or observer status in such organizations;
To advocate, as appropriate, for Taiwan's membership or observer status in all organizations as part of any relevant bilateral engagements between the United States and the People's Republic of China, including leader summits and the U.S.-China Comprehensive Economic Dialogue.

Reaction

Domestic
Speaker of the House Nancy Pelosi underlined the bipartisan support that helped pass the act and stated that it "celebrates and supports Taiwan’s commitment to democracy, by preserving and promoting its position on the international stage."

Taiwan
After the U.S. House of Representatives unanimously passed the act, Taiwanese President Tsai Ing-wen expressed thanks and said that "her country will continue to work with the U.S. to contribute to the peaceful and stable development of the Indo-Pacific Region."

People's Republic of China
China opposed the passing of the act, calling the move a severe violation of the one-China principle and the three China-U.S. joint communiques. It reiterated its stance that China has long been opposed to any form of official exchanges between Taiwan and the United States.

See also
 Taiwan Relations Act
 Taiwan Travel Act
 Six Assurances
 Political status of Taiwan

References

External links
 TAIPEI Act on House Floor
 Taiwan Allies International Protection and Enhancement Initiative (TAIPEI) Act  full text
 President Tsai thanks US House of Representatives for passing TAIPEI Act

Acts of the 116th United States Congress
United States foreign relations legislation
Taiwan–United States relations
China–United States relations
2020 in international relations